The Showbox (originally known as the Showbox Theater) is a music venue in Seattle, Washington. It has been owned by AEG Live since 2007.

History and usage
Founded in 1939, the Showbox has hosted a diverse offering of music over the decades. From the Jazz Age to the Grunge Era, the ballroom has featured shows by Duke Ellington, Muddy Waters, and the Ramones — as well as local artists such as burlesque performer Gypsy Rose Lee, and grunge bands Soundgarden, Pearl Jam, Mudhoney, TAD and Screaming Trees.

After many years of operating as the Improv Comedy Club, restaurateur Tony Riviera and Barry Bloch purchased the Improv with the intent of continuing operating the Venue as The Improv. Riviera and Bloch discovered old photos and historical information and articles about the Showbox and decided to recreate the venue to its original look and reopened New Year's Eve 1995 as The Showbox Comedy and Supper Club which they operated for several years before deciding to sell the Venue. Riviera went on to open numerous restaurants up and down the West Coast.

In July 2018, Vancouver-based developer Onni Group announced plans to redevelop the property into a 42-floor apartment tower. Local preservation advocates, including Historic Seattle, Friends of Historic Belltown, and Vanishing Seattle, submitted a landmark nomination for review by the City of Seattle's Landmarks Preservation Board in June 2019. The board unanimously decided to grant the Showbox landmark designation on July 17, 2019, preventing the renowned theater from being demolished.

Seattle musicians such as Pearl Jam, Duff McKagan, Alice in Chains, Death Cab for Cutie, andMacklemore voiced their support for preserving the Showbox. A petition on Change.org to name the Showbox an official City of Seattle landmark garnered over 110,000 signatures. The property owner filed a lawsuit against the city of Seattle. Claims of damages were dismissed by the court, but a trial was scheduled for August 2019 regarding other claims.

On November 19, 2019, the Historic Seattle group announced a partnership with the Seattle Theatre Group and submitted a formal offer to purchase the property. The partnership would retain AEG as the operating tenant through at least 2024.<ref>{{Cite web|url=https://historicseattle.org/advocacy/save-the-showbox/|title=Save The Showbox! -|last=description" >|first=Historic Seattle

Showbox SoDo

Showbox SoDo opened in 2007 and belongs to the "Showbox Presents" family. It is located at 1700 1st Avenue South, Seattle, Washington. It takes its name from the SoDo district, referring to an area south of T-Mobile Park and Lumen Field.

The Showbox added to its family in 2007 with the addition of the larger Showbox SoDo, a converted-warehouse-turned-concert venue located just south of the sports stadiums in the SoDo district. The space has  wood-beam and brick architecture. In its short history, the venue has already hosted events featuring My Bloody Valentine, Kid Rock, Heart, The Pogues, M.I.A, The Hives, Dropkick Murphys, Josh Ritter, Counting Crows, Panic! at the Disco, Adam Lambert, Odd Future, Jillian Banks, The WhiteTrash Whiplash, Trivium and many more.

This Showbox SoDo was originally built as a truck warehouse in 1935 for John Eddy Franklin who was also responsible for the Columbarium at Evergreen Washelli Funeral Home. The main part of the warehouse had a dirt floor and a gas pump.

References

External links
 

Nightclubs in Seattle
Music venues in Washington (state)
1939 establishments in the United States
Buildings and structures in Seattle
Music venues completed in 1939